Sheikh Khazal rebellion refers to the 1924 Arab separatist uprising by Khazal al-Kabi, the Sheikh of Mohammerah, in Iranian Khuzestan. The rebellion was quickly and efficiently suppressed by Reza Shah with minimal casualties, subduing the Bakhtiari tribes allied with Sheikh Khazal and resulting in his surrender.

Background

Khuzestan remained much out of the central Persian reach by 1923. Sheikh Khazal was supported by the British, who sent him some 3,000 arms and additional ammunition by 1919. He had been collecting taxes, but in fact paid a very small fraction to the central government.

In 1921, realizing the threat posed by Reza Pahlavi, who had just staged a coup d'état with Seyyed Zia'eddin Tabatabaee, Khazal proceeded to take steps in order to protect himself. In February 1922, the issue of taxation from tribal areas of Mohammerah was reopened by the Iranian government.

Sheikh Khazal and Bakhtiari Khan's met between April 29 and May 2, 1922, in Dar-e Khazinah to establish a cooperation; another meeting between the parties in Ahvaz produced a formal document that Khazal and Bakhtiaris would cooperate in every respect, although both would "continue to serve Iranian government faithfully and loyally". The agreement was an important step which paved the way to the establishment of the Southern League. The nucleus of the alliance, based on Sheikh Khazal and the Bakhtiaris, later tried to attract additional elements, including the Vali of Posht-e Kuh, Qavam ol-Molk of Khamsah and possibly Sawlat ol-Dowlat. The League however had no formal existence, being largely a temporary tribal confederation with common interests.

Conflict

1922 events
In July 1922, a column of 274 Iranian soldiers, including 12 officers under command of Colonel Hasan Agha, was sent by Reza Shah to Khuzestan through Bakhriari mountains to put pressure on Sheikh Khazal. The Bakhtiaris, unaware that the column was designated to Khuzestan and thinking their aim was to occupy their land, attacked them and destroyed the force. Only a handful of Iranian soldiers escaped the massacre. Enraged Reza Shah swore to take revenge on the incident; the Bakhtiaris however requested to be informed of such military operations in the future, in order to avoid misunderstandings. Reza Shah was however preoccupied with other troubles in Iranian frontier, most notably the Kurdish rebellion of Simko Shikak, preventing him from concentrating on retaliation towards the Bakhtiaris. The troubles with Bakhtiaris however continued in mid-September, when two minor Sheikhs of Bakhtiaris destroyed the village of Chughurt.

Negotiations
On 23 October 1923, Khazal was demanded to yield much of his possessions to the government, but the Sheikh rejected. He attempted to form an alliance with all the Bakhtiari, Lur and Khamseh tribes, in order to prevent Reza Shah from gaining too much power. His ultimate aim was that through this tribal alliance the Zagros Mountains would become a nearly impenetrable barrier against the forces of the central government. However, the various tribal groups often clashed with each other and were unable to come to agreements, and his proposal was mostly unanswered.

He then turned to Ahmad Shah Qajar and the Imperial Court of Tehran, presenting himself as a fiercely loyal defender and advocate of the Qajar dynasty, and calling upon the Court to take action against the ambitions of Reza Pahlavi. This eventually came to nothing as well. Khazal then sought to ally himself with the Majles (Iranian Parliament) opposition to Reza Shah, writing a number of letters to the opposition leader, Ayatollah Seyyed Hassan Modarres. In these letters Khazal presented himself as a staunch constitutionalist from the very beginning of the movement, emphatic as an Iranian nationalist, and a liberal democrat who found Reza Shah's authoritarianism to be personally offensive. The opposition accepted Khazal's proposal cautiously and not without much deliberation, as they did not trust him. However, the parliamentary opposition to Reza Shah failed.

Indifference from the Qajar court and the refusal of the British to lend him support ultimately led Khazal to go to the League of Nations in 1924 in an effort to gain international recognition of his sheikhdom and to gather support for the separation of his territory from Iran. This effort, however, ended in failure. Prior to the rise of Reza Shah, Khazal had never attempted to separate his sheikhdom from Qajar Persia, to which he had maintained staunch loyalty.

November 1924
In November 1924, Reza Pahlavi sent 3,000 soldiers to subdue the rebellious Sheikh. Two task forces were set, one for Dezful headed by Major-General Ayrom and another, under General Zahedi and Colonel Ali Akbar Javaheri-Farsi, were set from Isfahan and Shiraz through the Zagros mountains into Khuzestan plain. The force under General Zahedi  and Javaheri-Farsi defeated the Bakhtiari tribe who were Khazal's allies and submitted other Bakhtiaris into submission as well. Reza's arrival to Bushehr and concentration of Iranian soldiers around Ahwaz were enough to convince the Sheikh to seek a negotiated settlement. Because of Colonel Javaheri-Farsi bravery and leadership during the conflict and hatred by remaining Shikh’s defeated supporters , Colonel Ali Akbar Javaheri-Farsi was ambushed one early morning and was assassinated in Ahvaz.  He remains one of the heroes of the liberation of Khuzestan province in Iran up to now.

Khazal then turned to the British for help, and this time presented himself as a defender of Islam and Shari'a (Islamic law) against Reza Shah's Iranian secularism. Forced to choose between Khazal and Reza Pahlavi, the British completely withdrew their support and protection for Khazal's rule, claiming that the only reason they had supported him to begin with was due to the central government's inability to properly enforce its rule in Khuzestan. With British withdrawal of support, Sheikh Khazal disbanded his Arab forces and retired to Mohammerah.

Aftermath

1925 conclusion
In January 1925, Reza Shah sent his military commanders to the province to assert the authority of the provisional government in Tehran. An Imperial farman (executive order) was issued restoring the old name of the province, Khuzestan instead of Arabistan, and Khazal lost his authority over the various tribes under his command.

Later that spring Reza Shah made two attempts to convince Khaz'al to meet him in Tehran to discuss his position in the new government. However, Khazal was suspicious of Reza Shah's motives and refused to go there himself, instead stating that he would send an emissary. A few weeks later in April 1925, Reza Shah ordered one of his commanders, who had a friendly relationship with Khazal, to meet Khazal ostensibly to convince him to journey to Tehran. The commander, General Fazlollah Zahedi, accompanied by several government officials, met with Khazal and spent an evening with him on board his yacht, anchored in the Shatt al-Arab river.

Later that evening a gunboat led by Meguertitch Khan Davidkhanian, sent by Reza Shah, stealthily made its way next to the yacht, which was then immediately boarded by fifty Persian marines. The soldiers arrested Khazal and took him by motorboat down the river to Mohammerah, where a car was waiting to take him to the military base in Ahvaz. From there he was taken to Dezful, accompanied by his son, and then to the city of Khorramabad in Lorestan, and then eventually to Tehran. Upon his arrival, Khazal was warmly greeted and well received by Reza Shah, who assured him that his problems would be quickly settled, and that in the meantime, he would be treated very well. However, many of his personal assets in Iran were quickly liquidated and his properties eventually came under the domain of the Imperial government after Reza Shah was crowned the new Shah. The sheikhdom was abolished and the provincial authority took full control of regional affairs.

Further ethnic tensions

Khazal spent the rest of his life under virtual house arrest, unable to travel beyond Tehran's city limits. He was able to retain ownership of his properties in Kuwait and Iraq, where he was exempted from taxation. He died in May 1936 while alone in his house, as earlier in the day his servants had been taken to court by the police. It is said that he did not die of natural causes, but that he was murdered by one of the guards stationed outside his house under direct orders from Reza Shah.

See also
 Al Sabah
 Politics of Khuzestan Province
 History of Khuzestan

Further reading

References

1922 in Iran
1924 in Iran
Arab nationalism in Iran
Arab nationalist rebellions
Khuzestan conflict
Conflicts in 1922
Conflicts in 1924
Rebellions in Iran